= Adler Apotheke =

Adler Apotheke or Adler Pharmacy may refer to several pharmacies in Germany:

- Adler-Apotheke (Bayreuth)
- Adler-Apotheke (Berlin-Spandau)
- Adler-Apotheke (Böckingen)
- Adler Apotheke (Dortmund)
- Adler-Apotheke (Senftenberg)
- Adler-Apotheke (Stolberg)
- Adler-Apotheke (Worms)
