= Adler Apotheke (Dortmund) =

Pharmacy in Dortmund

Coordinates: 51°30′50″N 7°28′0″E

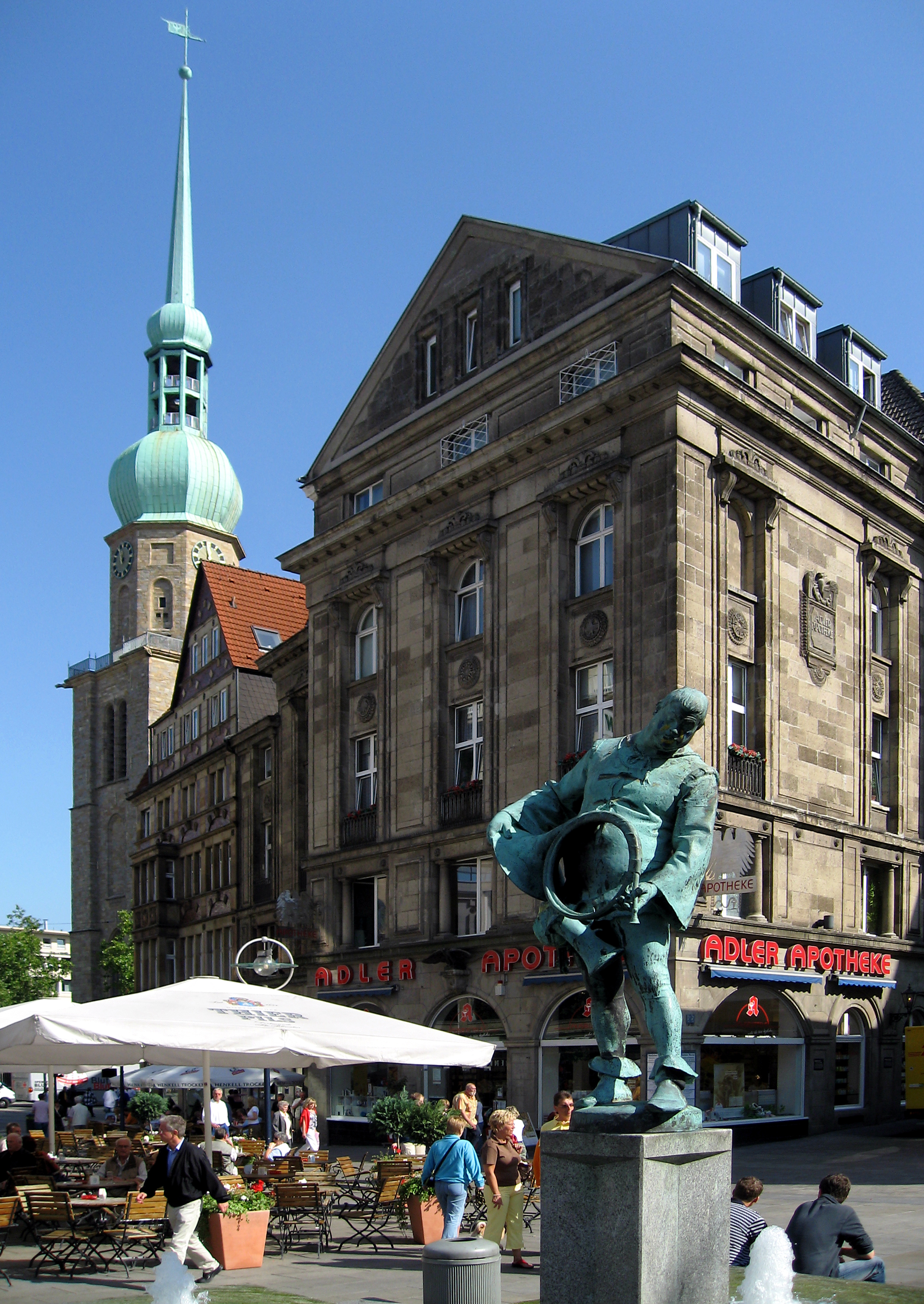
Adler Apotheke

The Adler Apotheke, in Dortmund, is the oldest existing pharmacy in its original location in North Rhine-Westphalia.

The pharmacy is located in a historic building at the Alter Markt in the heart of central Dortmund. Its existence was first documented in 1392 and was owned by the same family for over 500 years.

In the cellar buildings of today's pharmacy is now a pharmacy museum. Here can be found almost 100 square metres of exhibition pieces including an equipment room, laboratory and store rooms. On request, guided tours are offered by the private museum.
